This is a list of post-Roman triumphal arches. Since the Renaissance period, rulers and states have sought to glorify themselves or commemorate victories by erecting triumphal arches on the Roman model. Modern arches have ranged from temporary structures of wood and plaster set up to celebrate royal entries to large permanent stone structures built in prominent places in city centres. They have been built around the world in a variety of styles, ranging from conscious imitations of Roman arches to more loose interpretations influenced by local architectural styles.

See also
 List of Roman triumphal arches
 Memorial gates and arches

References

Triumphal arches
Triumphal arches
Triumphal arches